Madhuca crassipes is a plant in the family Sapotaceae. The specific epithet crassipes means "thick foot or stalk", referring to the fruit stalk.

Description
The bark is brown, mottled grey. Inflorescences bear up to 10 flowers which are fragrant and cream-coloured.

Distribution and habitat
Madhuca crassipes is native to Sumatra and Borneo. Its habitat is swamps and forests to  altitude.

Conservation
Madhuca crassipes has been assessed as near threatened on the IUCN Red List. The species is threatened by logging and conversion of land for palm oil plantations.

References

crassipes
Trees of Sumatra
Trees of Borneo
Plants described in 1902
Taxa named by Odoardo Beccari